Pope Damasus I (c. 305 – 11 December 384) was the bishop of Rome from October 366 to his death. He presided over the Council of Rome of 382 that determined the canon or official list of sacred scripture. He spoke out against major heresies (including Apollinarianism and Macedonianism) and thus solidifying the faith of the Catholic Church, and encouraged production of the Vulgate Bible with his support for Jerome.  He helped reconcile the relations between the Church of Rome and the Church of Antioch, and encouraged the veneration of martyrs.

As well as various prose letters and other pieces Damasus was the author of Latin verse. Alan Cameron describes his epitaph for a young girl called Projecta (of great interest to scholars as the Projecta Casket in the British Museum may have been made for her) as "a tissue of tags and clichés shakily strung together and barely squeezed into the meter". Damasus has been described as "the first society Pope", and was possibly a member of a group of Hispanic Christians, largely related to each other, who were close to the Hispanic Theodosius I.

A number of images of "DAMAS" in gold glass cups probably represent him and seem to be the first contemporary images of a pope to survive, though there is no real attempt at a likeness. "Damas" appears with other figures, including a Florus who may be Projecta's father.  It has been suggested that Damasus or another of the group commissioned and distributed these to friends or supporters, as part of a programme "insistently inserting his episcopal presence in the Christian landscape".

He is recognized as a saint by the Catholic Church; his feast day is 11 December.

Background
His life coincided with the rise of Emperor Constantine I and the reunion and re-division of the Western and Eastern Roman Empires, which is associated with the legitimization of Christianity and its later adoption as the official religion of the Roman state in 380.

The reign of Gratian, which coincided with Damasus' papacy, forms an important epoch in ecclesiastical history, since during that period (359–383), Catholic Christianity for the first time became dominant throughout the empire. Under the influence of Ambrose, Gratian refused to wear the insignia of the pontifex maximus as unbefitting a Christian, removed the Altar of Victory from the Senate at Rome, despite protests from the pagan members of the Senate. Emperor Gratian also forbade legacies of real property to the Vestals and abolished other privileges belonging to them and to the pontiffs.

Early life
Pope Damasus I was born in Rome around 305. Damasus' parents were Antonius, who became a priest at the Church of St. Lawrence (San Lorenzo) in Rome, and his wife Laurentia. Both parents originally come from the region of Lusitania. Damasus began his ecclesiastical career as a deacon in his father's church, where he went on to serve as a priest. This later became the basilica of Saint Lawrence outside the Walls in Rome.
 
During Damasus' early years, Constantine I rose to rule the Western Roman Empire. As emperor, he issued the Edict of Milan (313), which granted religious freedom to Christians in all parts of the Roman Empire. A crisis precipitated by the rejection of religious freedom by Licinius, Emperor of the Eastern Roman Empire, in favor of paganism resulted in a civil war in 324 that placed Constantine firmly in control of a reunited Empire. This led to the establishment of Christian religious supremacy in Constantinople and gradually led to a See in that city which sought to rival the authority of the Roman See. Damasus was most likely in his twenties at the time.

When Pope Liberius was banished by Emperor Constantius II to Berea in 354, Damasus was archdeacon of the Roman church and followed Liberius into exile, though he immediately returned to Rome. During the period before Liberius' return, Damasus had a great share in the government of the church.

Succession crisis
In the early Church, bishops were customarily elected by the clergy and the people of the diocese. While this simple method worked well in a small community of Christians unified by persecution, as the congregation grew in size, the acclamation of a new bishop was fraught with division, and rival claimants and a certain class hostility between patrician and plebeian candidates unsettled some episcopal elections. At the same time, 4th-century emperors expected each new pope-elect to be presented to them for approval, which sometimes led to state domination of the Church's internal affairs.

Following the death of Pope Liberius on 24 September 366, Damasus succeeded to the Papacy amidst factional violence.  The deacons and laity supported Liberius' deacon Ursinus. The upper-class former partisans of Felix, who had ruled during Liberius' exile, supported the election of Damasus.

The two were elected simultaneously (Damasus' election was held in San Lorenzo in Lucina). J. N. D. Kelly states that Damasus hired a gang of thugs that stormed the Julian Basilica, carrying out a three-day massacre of the Ursinians. Such was the violence and bloodshed that the two prefects of the city were called in to restore order, and after a first setback, when they were driven to the suburbs and a massacre of 137 was perpetrated in the basilica of Sicininus (the modern Basilica di Santa Maria Maggiore), the prefects banished Ursinus to Gaul. Both Cynthia White and Edward Gibbon have suggested a quid pro quo between the prefect Praetextatus and Damasus to secure his election and exile Urbanus, in return for Damasus's support of Praetextatus's power in Pagan circles. There was further violence when he returned, which continued after Ursinus was exiled again.

Another ancient narrative of events, the "Gesta" (dated to 368 A.D.), provides more detail. It describes Ursinus as being the valid successor to Liberius, and Damasus as following a heretical interloper, Felix. This account also records that an armed force instigated by Damasus broke into the Basilica of Julius and a three-day slaughtering of those assembled there took place. After gaining control of the Lateran basilica Damasus was then ordained as bishop in the cathedral of Rome. However, Damasus was accused of bribing the urban officials of Rome to have Ursinus and chief supporters exiled, including some presbyters.  As a result of this attempt, some of the (apparently quite numerous) supporters of Ursinus interrupted this process and rescued the presbyters, taking them to the Basilica of Liberius (identified as the "basilica of Sicinnius"), the apparent headquarters of the Ursinian sect. Damasus then responded by ordering an attack against the Liberian basilica, resulting in another massacre: "They broke down the doors and set fire underneath it, then rushed in...and killed a hundred and sixty of the people inside, both men and women."   Damasus next sent a final assault against some Ursinian supporters who had fled to the cemetery of Saint Agnes, slaying many.

Church historians such as Jerome and Rufinus championed Damasus. At a synod in 378, Ursinus was condemned and Damasus exonerated and declared the true pope. The former antipope continued to intrigue against Damasus for the next few years and unsuccessfully attempted to revive his claim on Damasus's death. Ursinus was among the Arian party in Milan, according to Ambrose.

Papacy
Damasus faced accusations of murder and adultery in his early years as pope. Edward Gibbon writes, "The enemies of Damasus styled him Auriscalpius Matronarum, the ladies' ear-scratcher." The neutrality of these claims has come into question with some suggesting that the accusations were motivated by the schismatic conflict with the supporters of Arianism.

Damasus I was active in defending the Catholic Church against the threat of schisms. In two Roman synods (368 and 369) he condemned Apollinarianism and Macedonianism, and sent legates to the First Council of Constantinople that was convoked in 381 to address these heresies.

Council of Rome of 382 and the Biblical canon
One of the important works of Pope Damasus was to preside in the Council of Rome of 382 that helped determine the canon or official list of Sacred Scripture. The Oxford Dictionary of the Christian Church states:
A council probably held at Rome in 382 under Damasus gave a complete list of the canonical books of both the Old Testament and the New Testament (also known as the 'Gelasian Decree' because it was reproduced by Gelasius in 495), which is identical with the list given at Trent. American Catholic priest and historian William Jurgens stated : "The first part of this decree has long been known as the Decree of Damasus, and concerns the Holy Spirit and the seven-fold gifts. The second part of the decree is more familiarly known as the opening part of the Gelasian Decree, in regard to the canon of Scripture: De libris recipiendis vel non-recipiendis. It is now commonly held that the part of the Gelasian Decree dealing with the accepted canon of Scripture is an authentic work of the Council of Rome of 382 A.D. and that Gelasius edited it again at the end of the fifth century, adding to it the catalog of the rejected books, the apocrypha. It is now almost universally accepted that these parts one and two of the Decree of Damasus are authentic parts of the Acts of the Council of Rome of 382 A.D."

Jerome, the Vulgate and the Canon
Pope Damasus appointed Jerome as his confidential secretary. Invited to Rome originally to a synod of 382 convened to end the schism of Antioch, he made himself indispensable to the pope, and took a prominent place in his councils. Jerome spent three years (382–385) in Rome in close intercourse with Pope Damasus and the leading Christians. Writing in 409, Jerome remarked, "A great many years ago when I was helping Damasus, bishop of Rome with his ecclesiastical correspondence, and writing his answers to the questions referred to him by the councils of the east and west..."

In order to put an end to the marked divergences in the western texts of that period, Damasus encouraged the highly respected scholar Jerome to revise the available Old Latin versions of the Bible into a more accurate Latin on the basis of the Greek New Testament and the Septuagint, resulting in the Vulgate. According to Protestant biblical scholar, F.F. Bruce, the commissioning of the Vulgate was a key moment in fixing the biblical canon in the West. Nonetheless,  as the Catholic Encyclopedia states,

Significant scholarly doubts and disagreements about the nature of the Apocrypha continued for centuries and even into Trent,  which  provided the first infallible definition of the Catholic canon in 1546.

Jerome devoted a very brief notice to Damasus in his De Viris Illustribus, written after Damasus' death: "he had a fine talent for making verses and published many brief works in heroic metre. He died in the reign of the emperor Theodosius at the age of almost eighty". Damasus may be the author of the anonymous Carmen contra paganos (song against the pagans).

Letter of Jerome to Damasus

The letters from Jerome to Damasus are examples of the primacy of the See of Peter:

Relations with the Eastern Church

The Eastern Church, in the person of Basil of Caesarea, earnestly sought the aid and encouragement of Damasus against an apparently triumphant Arianism. Damasus, however, harbored some degree of suspicion against the great Cappadocian Doctor of the Church. In the matter of the Meletian Schism at Antioch, Damasus – together with Athanasius of Alexandria, and his successor, Peter II of Alexandria – sympathized with the party of Paulinus as more sincerely representative of Nicene orthodoxy. On the death of Meletius he sought to secure the succession for Paulinus and to exclude Flavian. During his papacy, Peter II of Alexandria sought refuge in Rome from the persecuting Arians. He was received by Damasus, who supported him against the Arians.

Damasus supported the appeal of the Christian senators to Emperor Gratian for the removal of the altar of Victory from the Senate House, and lived to welcome the famous edict of Theodosius I, "De fide Catholica" (27 February 380), which proclaimed as the religion of the Roman State that doctrine which Peter had preached to the Romans and of which Damasus was head.

Devotion to the martyrs
Damasus also did much to encourage the veneration of the Christian martyrs, restoring and creating access to their tombs in the Catacombs of Rome and elsewhere, and setting up tablets with verse inscriptions composed by himself, several of which survive or are recorded in his Epigrammata.

Damasus rebuilt or repaired his father's church named for Laurence, known as San Lorenzo fuori le Mura ("St Lawrence outside the walls"), which by the 7th century was a station on the itineraries of the graves of the Roman martyrs. Damasus' regard for the Roman martyr is attested also by the tradition according to which the Pope built a church devoted to Laurence in his own house, San Lorenzo in Damaso.

Damasus was pope for eighteen years and two months. His feast day is 11 December.  He was buried beside his mother and sister in a "funerary basilica ... somewhere between the Via Appia and Via Ardeatina", the exact location of which is lost.

Since 2011, this saint has given its name to the San Damaso Ecclesiastical University, a Catholic center of higher education belonging to the Archbishopric of Madrid, in Spain, where theology, Canon Law, Religious Sciences, Christian and Classical Literature, and Philosophy can be studied.

See also 
 List of popes
 List of Catholic saints
 Pope Saint Damasus I, patron saint archive

References

Literature 

 Lippold, A.,  "Ursinus und Damasus," Historia 14 (1965), pp. 105–128.
 Sheperd, M. H.,  "The Liturgical Reform of Damasus," in Kyriakon. Festschrift für Johannes Quasten (ed. Patrick Granfield and J.A. Jungmann) II (Münster 1970) pp. 847–863.
 Green, M.,  "The Supporters of the Antipope Ursinus,"  Journal of Theological Studies 22 (1971) pp. 531–538. 
 Taylor, J.,  "St. Basil the Great and Pope Damasus," Downside Review 91 (1973), pp. 183–203, 261–274.
 Nautin, P.  "Le premier échange épistulaire entre Jérôme et Damase: lettres réelles ou fictives?," Freiburger Zeitschrift für Philosophie und Theologie 30, 1983, pp. 331–334.
Cameron, Alan, "The Date and the Owners of the Esquiline Treasure", American Journal of Archaeology, Vol 89, No. 1, Centennial Issue (Jan., 1985), pp. 135–145, JSTOR
 Reynolds, R. E., "An Early Medieval Mass Fantasy: The Correspondence of Pope Damasus and St Jerome on a Nicene Canon," in Proceedings of the Seventh International Congress of Medieval Canon Law, Cambridge, 23–27 July 1984 (ed. P. Linehan) (Città del Vaticano 1988), pp. 73–89. 
 
Grig, Lucy, "Portraits, Pontiffs and the Christianization of Fourth-Century Rome", Papers of the British School at Rome, Vol. 72, (2004), pp. 203–230, JSTOR
Lutraan, Katherine L., Late Roman Gold-Glass: Images and Inscriptions , MA thesis, McMaster University, 2006, available online -"investigates the images and inscriptions that decorate the extant corpus of gold-glass vessel bases". 
 Antonio Aste, Gli epigrammi di papa Damaso I. Traduzione e commento. Libellula edizioni, collana Università (Tricase, Lecce 2014).

 Markus Löx: monumenta sanctorum. Rom und Mailand als Zentren des frühen Christentums: Märtyrerkult und Kirchenbau unter den Bischöfen Damasus und Ambrosius. Wiesbaden, 2013.
 .
 Ursula Reutter: Damasus, Bischof von Rom (366–384). Leben und Werk (= Studien und Texte zu Antike und Christentum. Vol. 55). Mohr Siebeck, Tübingen, 2009,  (also: Jena, Univ., Diss., 1999).
 Franz X. Seppelt: Geschichte der Päpste von den Anfängen bis zur Mittel des zwanzigsten Jahrhunderts. Vol.: 1: Die Entfaltung der päpstlichen Machtstellung im frühen Mittelalter. Von Gregor dem Grossen bis zur Mitte des elften Jahrhunderts. 2nd newly revised edition (by Georg Schwaiger). Kösel, Munich, 1955, pp. 109–126.
 Bernhard Schimmelpfennig:  Das Papsttum. Von der Antike bis zur Renaissance. 6th edition. Bibliographically revised and updated by Elke Goez. Wissenschaftliche Buchgesellschaft, Darmstadt, 2009, .

External links

Opera Omnia by Migne Patrologia 
 
 

Popes
305 births
384 deaths
Papal names
4th-century Christian saints
4th-century Romans
Ancient Christians involved in controversies
Church Fathers
Papal saints
Portuguese popes
Ancient Roman poets
Portuguese Roman Catholic saints
Romans from Hispania
People from Idanha-a-Nova
4th-century popes
4th-century Latin writers
4th-century Roman poets